Carpobrotus, commonly known as pigface, ice plant, sour fig, Hottentot fig, and clawberry is a genus of ground-creeping plants with succulent leaves and large daisy-like flowers. The name comes from the Ancient Greek  "fruit" and  "edible", referring to its edible fruits.

The genus includes some 12 to 20 accepted species. Most are endemic to South Africa, but there are at least four Australian species and one South American.

Distribution and habitat
Carpobrotus chiefly inhabits sandy coastal habitats in mild Mediterranean climates, and can be also found inland in sandy to marshy places. In general, they prefer open sandy spaces where their wiry, long roots with shorter side branches form dense underground network, which extends much further than above-ground prostrate branches. Plants thrive well in gardens, but can easily escape to other suitable places. They easily form wide-area ground covers over a sandy soil, which easily suppresses indigenous sand dune vegetation when Carpobrotus is introduced to a non-native area.

Carpobrotus is native to South Africa, south Australian coast and coastal Chile. As an introduced species, it became widespread on similar habitats in the Northern Hemisphere: Pacific coast of the United States; Mediterranean and Atlantic coasts of Europe; and New Zealand.

Ecology
The fruit of various species of Carpobrotus is eaten by many animals and birds that also spread its seed.

Various Carpobrotus species are invasive introduced species in suitable climates throughout the world. The harm they do is variable, and sometimes hotly debated, when balanced against their value as firebreaks and as food for wildlife. Seeds are spread by mammals such as deer, rabbits, and rodents eating mature fruit.

Uses
Carpobrotus acinaciformis and Carpobrotus edulis are often used for groundcover due to their rapid growth, dense habit, and resistance to fire. Carpobrotus are also drought tolerant.

Medicinal and nutritional value
C. glaucescens is noted for its salty fruit, a rare property in fruits.

Carpobrotus leaf juice can be used as a mild astringent. Applied to the skin, it is a popular emergency treatment for jellyfish and similar stings. When mixed with water it can be used to treat diarrhea and stomach cramps. It can also be used as a gargle for sore throat, laryngitis, and mild bacterial infections of the mouth. It can also be used externally, much like aloe vera, for wounds, mosquito bites and sunburn. It is also used to treat skin conditions. It was a remedy for tuberculosis mixed with honey and olive oil. The fruit has been used as a laxative.

Species
The following list excludes names regarded as synonyms, but includes species whose status still is unresolved.
Carpobrotus acinaciformis  (L.) L.Bolus 
Carpobrotus aequilaterus  (Haw.) N.E.Br. 
Carpobrotus chilensis  (Molina) N.E.Br. 
Carpobrotus deliciosus  (L.Bolus) L.Bolus 
Carpobrotus dimidiatus  (Haw.) L.Bolus 
Carpobrotus edulis  (L.) N.E.Br. 
Carpobrotus glaucescens  (Haw.) Schwantes 
Carpobrotus mellei  (L.Bolus) L.Bolus 
Carpobrotus modestus  S.T.Blake 
Carpobrotus muirii  (L.Bolus) L.Bolus 
Carpobrotus praecox  (F.Muell.) G.D.Rowley specific status unresolved. 
Carpobrotus pulleinei  J.M.Black specific status unresolved. 
Carpobrotus quadrifidus  L.Bolus 
Carpobrotus rossii  (Haw.) Schwantes 
Carpobrotus virescens  (Haw.) Schwantes

References

External links
 NSW Flora online - Carpobrotus
 PlantZAfrica.com - Carpobrotus edulis

 
Aizoaceae genera
Taxa named by N. E. Brown